Cristóbal Merlos (born 13 November 1978) is a Salvadoran archer. He competed in the men's individual event at the 2000 Summer Olympics.

References

1978 births
Living people
Salvadoran male archers
Olympic archers of El Salvador
Archers at the 2000 Summer Olympics
Sportspeople from San Salvador
Pan American Games medalists in archery
Pan American Games bronze medalists for El Salvador
Archers at the 2003 Pan American Games
Medalists at the 2003 Pan American Games
21st-century Salvadoran people